Witt, Seibert & Halsey was an American architectural firm based in the twin cities of Texarkana, Arkansas and Texarkana, Texas, with a practice extending into Arkansas, Louisiana and Texas. It was founded by architect Sidney Stewart, but achieved prominence under Bayard Witt and Eugene C. Seibert.

History
Bayard Witt was born in 1880 in Witt's Foundry, Tennessee. He worked as a railroad laborer and foreman before obtaining an apprenticeship in civil engineering. In 1904 he moved to Texarkana, Arkansas, joining the office of architect Sidney Stewart, who had been practicing in Texarkana since at least 1900. By 1907, Witt was a partner in the firm of Stewart & Witt.

Eugene Charles Seibert was born in 1878 in Berea, Ohio. He attended the Case School of Applied Science and Columbia University before entering the office of prominent Fort Worth architects Sanguinet & Staats. In 1908, he moved to Texarkana, joining Stewart & Witt. In 1909, Sidney Stewart chose to return to his native Canada. The firm was then established in 1909 as Witt & Seibert.  Fred H. Halsey was added as partner in 1911, the firm becoming Witt, Seibert & Company. Halsey had attended Washington University in St. Louis, and had also worked in Fort Worth. Halsey's name was added to the firm's in 1919.

The partnership was dissolved in 1937, when Seibert left to form his own practice. Witt & Halsey continued briefly, separating in 1940. Witt continued alone until 1944, when he took Robert Reinheimer Jr. as partner in Witt & Reinheimer, which was dissolved upon Witt's death in 1947.

Seibert maintained his independent practice until his death in 1941. He was also mayor of Texarkana, Arkansas from 1934 to 1939. Halsey entered government service after dissolving his partnership with Witt, but later returned to architectural practice. He died in 1978.

Legacy
After Bayard Witt's passing, Reinheimer continued the practice as Reinheimer & Cox and Reinheimer, Cox & Associates into the 1970s.

The firm is responsible for a number of properties which have been placed on the National Register of Historic Places for their architectural significance.

Architectural works

References

Architecture firms based in Arkansas
Defunct architecture firms based in Texas